Roosevelt Sledge, Jr. (born December 21, 1987), better known by his stage name R.O.E., is an American singer-songwriter from Chicago, Illinois. He first gained popularity after the release of his single "Shine" from his debut album, Radiant. In 2020, his single "Higher" was featured on many hip hop blogs and independent radio stations around the US and Europe. In 2021, the rapper returned with a new style and sound with his release, Money Ain't A Thing. Now residing in Los Angeles, he is preparing new music for release in 2022 and beyond.

Discography
 Radiant (2020)
 Money Ain't A Thing (2021)
 Let Me Love You (2022)

References

1987 births
African-American male rappers
Living people
Rappers from Chicago
21st-century American rappers
21st-century American male musicians
21st-century African-American musicians
20th-century African-American people